Tony Lekain, real name Tony Théodore Weill, (5 November 1888 – 26 December 1966) was a French film director, who was active during the 1920s and 1930s.

Selected filmography 
 1926: Le Fauteuil 47 with Gaston Ravel
 1927: Le Bonheur du jour with Gaston Ravel
 1929: Figaro, with Gaston Ravel
 1929: The Queen's Necklace, with Gaston Ravel
 1932: Monsieur de Pourceaugnac, with Gaston Ravel 
 1934: , with Gaston Ravel, after the novel by Florence L. Barclay.
 1934: Fanatisme, with Gaston Revel

External links 
 
 Les Gens du cinéma

Film directors from Paris
1888 births
1966 deaths